Josette Bushell-Mingo OBE (born 16 February 1964) is a Sweden-based English theatre actress and director of African descent, who was born in London and has been living and working in Sweden for many years. In February 2021, the Royal Central School of Speech and Drama announced she had been appointed as the incoming Principal of the School. She is the first person of African descent, the first woman since 1942, and the third woman overall to hold this role. Previously, she served as artistic director for The National Touring Swedish Deaf Theatre ensemble TystTeater for 13 years before accepting a position as the Head of the theatre department at the Stockholm University of the Arts in 2019.

Background
Josette Bushell-Mingo was born in 1964 in the Lewisham area of London to Guyanese parents – her father was a bus driver, her mother a nurse – and grew up in Plaistow. She has three sisters. At 17, she auditioned for and was admitted to Barking College, where she did her A levels in Drama, Theatre Design, and Performing Arts. During her last two weeks at Barking, she received two offers: one from Breton University to pursue a BA in theatre and the other from Kaboodle Theatre Company. She chose Kaboodle because "a black girl [was] in it as well". After Kaboodle, she acted with the Royal Shakespeare Company and the Royal National Theatre.

Career
In 1999, she appeared as Solveig in the Royal Exchange Manchester production of Peer Gynt and she returned in 2005 to play Cleopatra in Antony and Cleopatra. Both productions were directed by Braham Murray. She was nominated for a Laurence Olivier Award in 1999 for Best Actress in a Musical for her role as Rafiki in the London production of The Lion King. She has also worked with Doppleganger Theatre Company, Kiss Theatre Company (Holland), Black Mime, Half Moon Young People's Theatre, Lumiere & Son Theatre Company, and Rainmaker Theatre for the Deaf.

In 2001, she founded the Push Arts Festival with the Young Vic Theatre, an event that aims both to empower Black creators as well as to normalize their presence and leadership within major institutions within the theatre community and beyond. She also served as its artistic director. It was because of her efforts with Push that she was awarded an OBE in 2006. In 2010, she was one of several Afro-Swede actors to found TRYCK, a community for Black actors in Sweden.

In 2016, she wrote and performed Nina - A Story About Me and Nina Simone,  a "deeply personal and often searing show inspired by the singer and activist Nina Simone, at the Unity Theatre. The show ran at the Young Vic Theatre in July 2017 before moving to the Traverse Theatre in August.

From 2005-2018, she was the Artistic Director for the National Touring Swedish Deaf Theatre ensemble TystTeater. The company's 2008 signed production of The Odyssey received huge critical acclaim in Scandinavia.

After leaving the National Touring Swedish Deaf Theatre, she became the Head of Acting at the Stockholm University of the Arts. She is the first woman to hold this position.

Bushell-Mingo has served as the Chairwoman for CinemAfrica and as a board member for the Swedish Film Institute, Women in Film and Television Sweden, and the Stockholm Academy of Dramatic Arts. She has also given lectures and taught at a number of theatre schools such as London Academy of Music and Dramatic Art, New York University Tisch School of the Arts, Coventry University, London College of Fashion, and Malmö Theatre Academy.

Though she primarily works in theatre, Bushell-Mingo has also appeared in the Swedish show Nudlar och 08:or as Martha in 1997 and in a 2015 episode of Bröllop, begravning och dop as Xamina. She has also starred in the films Girls & Boys (dir. Ninja Thyberg, 2015); Flickan, mamman och demonerna (dir. Suzanne Osten, 2016). She also headlined as Kandia in Dani Kouyaté's award-winning film While We Live.

Personal life
Bushell-Mingo has lived in Sweden for nearly 20 years. She is married to Swedish producer Stefan Karsberg; they have two sons, Ruben and Joshua. She is fluent in Swedish sign language.

Stage credits

Directing credits

Acting credits

Honours and awards

References

External links
 Official Website
 Theatricalia profile

1964 births
Living people
English theatre directors
Officers of the Order of the British Empire
English stage actresses
English expatriates in Sweden
People from Lewisham
English people of Guyanese descent
Black British actresses
Royal Shakespeare Company members
People from Plaistow, Newham